Cornelis Hiddingh, RNL (10 June 1809 – 4 September 1871) was a South African born Dutch lawyer and civil servant, who acted as special envoy to the Orange Free State and South African Republic in 1855–1856 and was consul general of the Orange Free State in the Netherlands between 1861 and 1871.

Family

Hiddingh, born in Cape Town on 10 June 1809, was the second son of Willem Hiddingh (1773–1839) and Anna Margaretha van der Poel (1780–1854). His father was a member of a prominent old Dutch family from the province of Drenthe, where he practised as lawyer. As a supporter of the Orange political faction in the Netherlands, Willem Hiddingh found himself out of place under the revolutionary Batavian government, and requested for an appointment in the Cape of Good Hope. In 1802 he was appointed member of the Raad van Justitie (Council of Justice) in Cape Town and moved there. He kept this position for twenty-five years under both Dutch and British rule, until his retirement in 1827.

Hiddingh married Assen 11 May 1852 with Georgina Aleijda Oosting (1822–1898), a daughter of Hendrik Jan Oosting, mayor of Assen, and Mana Hofstede. The couple had twelve children, seven sons and five daughters.

Early life
Cornelis Hiddingh came to the Netherlands in 1820, together with his older brother Willem (1808–1899), to attend school. The brothers were first taken in by Petrus Hofstede, a family member, and governor of the province of Drenthe, who lodged them for several months at his country estate, and also acted as guardian. Thereafter they were sent to private boarding school in Groningen to complete their school education. In 1824 both enrolled in the University of Groningen to study law, and both graduated as doctor of law in 1830. Willem then returned to South Africa, Cornelis remained in the Netherlands. After concluding his studies, Hiddingh established himself in the provincial town of Assen, where he became a tax collector and alderman in the town government. Later he established himself here as a lawyer.

Dutch envoy to South Africa
In 1855 King Willem III of the Netherlands appointed Hiddingh his special envoy to the newly formed Boer republics of the Orange Free State and Transvaal. The visit to the Orange Free State was special, as the main purpose was to present a flag and coat-of-arms, as a gift from King Willem III to the government and people of the Republic. The initiative for the design and production of both parafernalia had come from state president Hoffman and government secretary Groenendaal of the Orange Free State. However, Hofmann was no longer in office when Hiddingh arrived and the new state president, Boshoff, was in the dark about the parafernalia ordered by his predecessor. Boshoff was very cautious, in order not to offend the British government, and hesitated to receive Hiddingh in an official capacity. In response Groenendaal and Landdrost Smellekamp started a press offensive against Boshoff in newspapers in both Bloemfontein and Cape Town, strongly condemning Boshoff for his actions. The latter then had no choice but to dismiss both. Obviously, Hiddingh felt less than welcome on the occasion. However, it did not deter him from executing his mission and becoming a lifelong supporter of the republic and it people. His successful mission to South Africa earned Hiddingh the gratitude of King and government in the form of a knighthood in the Order of the Netherlands Lion.

The Dutch government had also charged Hiddingh with another diplomatic mission. He was asked to discreetly inform the government of the Orange Free State that consul Lauts was perhaps not the best person to represent the republic, and propose a replacement. Hiddingh had Jacob Spengler in mind, president of the Amsterdam Chamber of Commerce. The Volksraad adopted the proposal and decided to offer Spengler the position. However, State President Boshoff did not give a follow-up to the decision, and consequently Spengler was never appointed or even asked.

Hiddingh continued his trip with a visit to the South African Republic which had some hiccups as well. His opinion about that country and its government was probably already negatively influenced by Smellekamp, who had left the Transvaal under a cloud several years before, and with whom Hiddingh had lodged in Bloemfontein. Hiddingh avoided a meeting with state president M.W. Pretorius and showed a lack of understanding about the character of the South African Republic, its government, and people in the report about his trip.

Consul-General of the Orange Free State
Between 1856 and 1861 the Consulate Generalship remained vacant, although the Dutch government and others regarded Hiddingh as their main – semi-official – contact with the republic. On 10 September 1861, the government of the Orange Free State appointed Hiddingh consul general of the Orange Free State in the Kingdom of the Netherlands. The Royal Decree with his acceptance was issued on 27 November 1861. Again, as with Lauts, the Volksraad was not asked to ratify the appointment, a judicial mistake only repaired three years later, on 8 February 1864. The consulate was established in Arnhem, Hiddingh's residence at the time.

Hiddingh's life came to a sudden and untimely end when he was killed in a train accident in his hometown, Arnhem, Netherlands.

Notes

References
 
 
 
 

1809 births
1871 deaths
People from Cape Town
Afrikaner people
South African people of Dutch descent
South African emigrants to the Netherlands
South African diplomats
19th-century Dutch diplomats
19th-century Dutch lawyers
Aldermen in Drenthe
People from Assen